Bartolomeo del Tintore was an Italian manuscript illuminator, active in Bologna in the 15th century from at least 1459 (prior to the 1473 arrival of Taddeo Crivelli). He was still active in Bologna in the 1490s.

References

Year of birth unknown
Year of death unknown
15th-century Italian painters
Italian male painters
Manuscript illuminators
Painters from Ferrara